The Great Eastern Tower (also known as Menara Great Eastern) in Kuala Lumpur, Malaysia, is the headquarters of Great Eastern Life Assurance (M) Bhd, a member of Great Eastern Holdings Ltd in Singapore.  It is located along Jalan Ampang.

See also
 List of skyscrapers

References

External links
 Great Eastern Life Assurance (M) Bhd
 Menara Great Eastern
 Great Eastern Singapore

Skyscrapers in Kuala Lumpur
Shopping malls in Kuala Lumpur
Office buildings completed in 2002
Shopping malls established in 2002
2002 establishments in Malaysia
Postmodern architecture in Malaysia
Skyscraper office buildings in Kuala Lumpur